Pivovar Kocour Varnsdorf was established in 2008 and is one of the few breweries in the Czech Republic to produce ale rather than just lager.

Kocour also collaborates with brewers around the world to produce special beers, such as the V3 Rauchbier - a collaboration between Kocour, Kaltenecker in Slovakia and a Hungarian craft brewer.

External links
 New Czech Breweries
 Thoughts on Kocour

Breweries in the Czech Republic
Food and drink companies established in 2008
Czech companies established in 2008